Kürsəngi (Kursangi, Gursangya) is a village and municipality in the Salyan District of Azerbaijan. It has a population of 4000.

References 

Populated places in Salyan District (Azerbaijan)